Jack Critcher is a former politician in Arkansas. He served as a state legislator in the Arkansas House of Representatives and Arkansas Senate. He also served as the President of the Arkansas Senate.

Critcher lives in Batesville, Arkansas and has served as mayor, alderman, and as a school board member as well as in the Arkansas House in 1995 and 1997 and in the Arkansas Senate in 1999, 2001, 2003, 2005, and 2007.

References

Year of birth missing (living people)
Living people
American politicians